Henry W. Peckwell (1852–1936) was an American artist. He was best known for his work as a wood engraver, for publications such as Scribner's Magazine and Harper's Magazine.

Personal
Peckwell was born and raised in New York City, where he also spent his career. In 1883 he married Emma Mackenzie (1853–1934). In 1905, they resided at The Alpine apartment building at Broadway and 32nd Street. He was an active member of the New York Athletic Club over the course of several decades. He died in November 1936 and is interred at the Green-Wood Cemetery in Brooklyn, New York.

Career

Wood engraving
Peckwell's wood engravings were part of the "new school" of wood engraving in the last decades of the 19th century, and his work employed and advanced that school's innovatory and more subtle techniques.  The persistence of finely crafted hand-done wood engravings in the face of modern photoengraving was also noted in the 1897 Columbian Cyclopedia, which noted in its entry on "wood-engraving" that Peckwell was "among the most noted and skillful of the present school."

He was also numbered among a group of "splendid engravers" by the "Brooklyn Museum Quarterly" in 1916.

His engravings, usually after paintings by other artists, appeared not only in national magazines such as Scribner's and Harper's, but were also collected in primers such as The Children's Second Reader by Ellen M. Cyr.

Other engraving
He also did engraving work on commission, for works such as bookplates.

Art instruction
In 1909, Peckwell was recorded as a tutor at the City College of New York with a salary of $1,300.00 which was then increased to $1,400.00.

Awards
1901: Bronze medal, the Pan-American Exposition, Buffalo, New York.

Exhibits
1901:  Peckwell's "Death of Braddock" after Howard Pyle, the Pan-American Exposition in Buffalo, New York.
1915:  Peckwell's "Midsummer" after Henry Moore, and "A Story Without Words" after Howard Pyle, exhibition of American wood engraving, the American Institute Of Graphic Arts.

References

Bibliography
 Anthony, Andrew Varick Stout, Timothy Cole, and Elbridge Kingsley.  "Wood Engraving:  Three Essays, With a List of American Books Illustrated With Woodcuts."  New York:  The Grolier Club, 1916.
 Brooks, Stratton Duluth.  Peckwell, et al., illus.  "Brook's Readers, Third Year." New York: American Book Company, 1906.
 Johnson, Robert Underwood, and Clarence Clough Buel.  Peckwell, et al., illus.  "Battles and Leaders of the Civil War." New York: The Century Co., 1887.

External links
 Works by Peckwell at the National Gallery of Art, Washington, D.C.
 Works by Peckwell at the New York Public Library, Picture Collection Online, New York, New York
 Google Books, "The Village Blacksmith," after Landseer
 Google Books, "Sir Galahad," after Watts

1852 births
1936 deaths
American engravers
American wood engravers
American illustrators
Artists from New York City